The final letter of Muhammad al-Mahdi, known as the Hidden Imam in Twelver Shi'ism, to his agent Abu al-Hasan Ali ibn Muhammad al-Samarri predicted his imminent death and announced the beginning of the Major Occultation (941–present). In Twelver belief, the Major Occultation concludes with the rise of al-Mahdi in the end of time to establish peace and justice on earth. This letter belongs to the Tawqi'at, a collection of signed letters and pronouncements attributed to the Hidden Imam.

Etymology 
 is derived from the verb , a polysemous word which often means to fall or cause to fall.  itself means a person's name or mark used in signing a letter (signature). Historically,  referred to a sign on camel's saddle. In this sense,  came be identified with a signature of caliph or ruler on a letter. In Twelver literature, the former word often refers the collection of signed letters and pronouncements attributed to the Hidden Imam.

Historical background 
Until their deaths, the tenth and eleventh Shia Imams (Ali al-Hadi and Hasan al-Askari, respectively) were held in the garrison town of Samarra under close surveillance or house arrest by the Abbasids, who are often responsible in Shia sources for poisoning the two Imams. 

Contemporary to the tenth Imam, the Abbasid al-Mutawakkil violently prosecuted the Shia, partly due to a renewed Zaydi opposition. The restrictive policies of al-Mutawakkil towards the tenth Imam were later adopted by his son, al-Mu'tamid, who is reported to have kept the eleventh Imam under house arrest without any visitors. Instead, al-Askari is known to have primarily communicated with his followers through a network of representatives. Among them was Uthman ibn Sa'id, who is said to have disguised himself as a seller of cooking fat to avoid the Abbasid agents, hence his nickname al-Samman. Tabatabai suggests that these restrictions were placed on al-Askari because the caliphate had come to know about traditions among the Shia elite, predicting that the eleventh Imam would father the eschatological Mahdi.

Immediately after the death of al-Askari in 260 AH (874 CE), Uthman ibn Sa'id claimed that the eleventh Imam had a young son, named Muhammad, who had entered a state of occultation due to the Abbasid threat to his life. As the special agent of al-Askari, Uthman also claimed that he had been appointed to represent his son, Muhammad, though he is more commonly known as Muhammad al-Mahdi. Twelver sources detail that Muhammad al-Mahdi made his only public appearance to lead the funeral prayer for his father instead of his uncle, Ja'far. 

Thus began a period of about seventy years, later termed the Minor Occultation (260-329 AH, 874–940 CE), during which it is believed that four successive agents acted as intermediaries between the Hidden Imam and his followers. These four agents are collectively known as the Four Deputies.

Content of the letter
The fourth agent, Abu al-Hasan Ali ibn Muhammad al-Samarri, is said to have received a letter from al-Mahdi shortly before his death in 329 (941). The letter predicted the death of the fourth agent in six days and announced the beginning of the complete occultation, later called the Major Occultation. The letter, ascribed to al-Mahdi, added that the complete occultation would continue until God granted him permission to manifest himself again in a time when the earth would be filled with tyranny. The letter also emphasized that anyone claiming to be the deputy of the Imam henceforth had to be considered an imposter. 

This and similar letters to the four agents and other Shia figures are said to have had the same handwriting, suggesting that they were written by the Hidden Imam. Ibn Babawayh and Tusi both quote this final letter, parts of which are presented below:

See also
Hadith of Jesus Praying Behind Mahdi
Four Deputies
Reappearance of Muhammad al-Mahdi
Signs of the appearance of Mahdi

References

Sources
 
 
 
 
 
 
 
 
 
 
 
 
 
 
 

Hujjat Allah al-Mahdi